The Allied Military Government of Occupied Territories (originally abbreviated AMGOT, later AMG) was the form of military rule administered by Allied forces during and after World War II within European territories they occupied.

Notable AMGOT 

This form of controlled government was implemented in the states of Germany, Italy, Austria and Japan, amongst others.

Opposition of France 

US President Franklin Roosevelt insisted that an AMGOT should be implemented in France, but this was opposed by both Henry Stimson, the US Secretary of War, the US Under-Secretary for War, as well as Allied Europe Supreme Commander, General Dwight Eisenhower, who had been strongly opposed to the imposition of AMGOT in North Africa. Eisenhower, unlike Roosevelt, wanted to cooperate with Charles de Gaulle, and he secured a last-minute promise from Roosevelt on the eve of D-Day that the Allied officers would not act as military governors and would instead cooperate with the local authorities as the Allied forces liberated French territory. De Gaulle would, however, later claim in his memoirs that he blocked AMGOT.

The AMGOT would have been implemented in France after its liberation if not for the Free French establishing control of the country per the Provisional Government of the French Republic in the name of the Free French Forces and the united French Resistance (FFI) following the liberation of Paris by the French themselves instead of the Allies, in August 1944.

Germany 

Germany's control was notably divided amongst the powers of the Soviet Union, the United States, the United Kingdom, and France.

Italy

Sicily
After Operation Husky,  with the Allied Invasion of Sicily on July 10, 1943, the Allied Military Government of Occupied Territories (AMGOT) was established with Staff Officer Francis Rodd, 2nd Baron Rennell and Civil Affairs officer  colonel Charles Poletti.

Interviewed by the News Chronicle, Rennell was asked about the controversial decision to retain the services of the Carabinieri and other police and officials who had worked for the Fascist regime, and answered "They are doing an excellent job and deserve to be trusted.  Their oath had been to the King, not to Mussolini. (...) We do not seek the support of any political group, neither anti-Fascists nor any others. For the time being, all political gatherings are forbidden in Sicily. We are a military administration, we have no mandate to make any political or social  reforms". 

In February 1944 the AMGOT handed over the administration to the Badoglio Cabinet.
It continued to operate as "Allied Military Government" in the Italian territories liberated from the Germans until the end of the war.

Free Territory of Trieste 

The Allied Military Government of the Free Territory of Trieste was a follow-on from the military government of occupied Italy. The Free Territory of Trieste was created by the 16th UNSC Resolution adopted at the 91st meeting by 10 votes to none, with 1 abstention (Australia), 10 January 1947, and established by the signature of the Treaty of Peace with Italy, 10 February 1947, then entered in force from 15 September 1947. The instrument for the provisional regime of the Free Territory of Trieste provides that the allied and associated military forces govern the territory. The historical situation saw the division into two administration areas called Zone A, including the capital Trieste and the Free Port of Trieste (ports areas within the boundaries delineated in 1939) and Zone B comprising the area of the cities of Koper Izola, Umago, Buje and Cittanova. Zone A was assigned to the Anglo-Americans and Zone B to the Yugoslavs. Military governments ended when in November 1954 under the provisions of the London Memorandum, among the United States, United Kingdom, Italy and Yugoslavia, to become a civil administration. Zone A was assigned to Italy (not yet a member of the UNO) and Zone B was assigned to Yugoslavia.

See also 
 Allied Commission
 A Bell for Adano is a 1944 novel by John Hersey centered on the AMGOT control of the fictional Italian village of Adano based on the real-life village of Licata, Italy.

References 

Trieste Revenue stamps listed in ''Italy Revenues" by J.Barefoot Ltd, York, 2013, .

External links 
 Infoplease-Military Government
 Allied Military Currency 

Military occupation
Aftermath of World War II